La Salzadella is a municipality located in Spain.

References

Baix Maestrat
municipalities in the Province of Castellón